Perovskite is a calcium titanium oxide mineral composed of calcium titanate (chemical formula ). Many different cations can be embedded in this structure, allowing the development of diverse engineered materials.

History 
The mineral was discovered in the Ural Mountains of Russia by Gustav Rose in 1839 and is named after Russian mineralogist Lev Perovski (1792–1856). Perovskite's notable crystal structure was first described by Victor Goldschmidt in 1926 in his work on tolerance factors. The crystal structure was later published in 1945 from X-ray diffraction data on barium titanate by Helen Dick Megaw.

Occurrence 
Found in the Earth's mantle, perovskite's occurrence at Khibina Massif is restricted to the silica under-saturated ultramafic rocks and foidolites, due to the instability in a paragenesis with feldspar. Perovskite occurs as small anhedral to subhedral crystals filling interstices between the rock-forming silicates.

Perovskite is found in contact carbonate skarns at Magnet Cove, Arkansas, in altered blocks of limestone ejected from Mount Vesuvius, in chlorite and talc schist in the Urals and Switzerland, and as an accessory mineral in alkaline and mafic igneous rocks, nepheline syenite, melilitite, kimberlites and rare carbonatites. Perovskite is a common mineral in the Ca-Al-rich inclusions found in some chondritic meteorites.

The stability of perovskite in igneous rocks is limited by its reaction relation with sphene. In volcanic rocks perovskite and sphene are not found together, the only exception being an etindite from Cameroon.

A rare-earth-bearing variety knopite with the chemical formula  is found in alkali intrusive rocks in the Kola Peninsula and near Alnö, Sweden. A niobium-bearing variety dysanalyte occurs in carbonatite near Schelingen, Kaiserstuhl, Germany.

In stars and brown dwarfs 
In stars and brown dwarfs the formation of perovskite grains is responsible for the depletion of titanium oxide in the photosphere. Stars with a low temperature have dominant bands of TiO in their spectrum; as the temperature gets lower for stars and brown dwarfs with an even lower mass, CaTiO3 forms and at temperatures below 2000 K TiO is undetectable. The presence of TiO is used to define the transition between cool M-dwarf stars and the colder L-dwarfs.

Physical properties 

The eponymous Perovskite  crystallizes in the  space group (No. 62) with lattice constants  Å,  Å and  Å.

Perovskites have a nearly cubic structure with the general formula . In this structure the A-site ion, in the center of the lattice, is usually an alkaline earth or rare-earth element. B-site ions, on the corners of the lattice, are 3d, 4d, and 5d transition metal elements. The A-site cations are in 12-fold coordination with the anions, while the B-site cations are in 6-fold coordination. A large number of metallic elements are stable in the perovskite structure if the Goldschmidt tolerance factor  is in the range of 0.75–1.0

 

where RA, RB and RO are the ionic radii of A and B site elements and oxygen, respectively. The stability of perovskites can be characterized with the tolerance and octahedral factors. When conditions are not fulfilled, a layered geometry for edge-sharing or face-sharing octahedra or lower B-site coordination is preferred. These are good structural bounds, but not an empirical prediction.

Perovskites have sub-metallic to metallic luster, colorless streak, and cube-like structure along with imperfect cleavage and brittle tenacity. Colors include black, brown, gray, orange to yellow. Perovskite crystals have been mistaken for galena; however, galena has a better metallic luster, greater density, perfect cleavage and true cubic symmetry.

Perovskite derivatives

Double perovskites 
The cation arrangement will differ based on charge, coordination geometry, and the ratio between A cation and B cation radii. The B and B’ cations lead to different ordering schemes. These ordering schemes are rock salt, columnar, and layered structures.
Rock salt is an alternating, three-dimensional checkerboard of B and B’ polyhedra. This structure is the most common from an electrostatic point of view, as the B sites will have different valence states. Columnar arrangement can be viewed as sheets of B-cation polyhedral viewed from the [111] direction. Layered structures are seen as sheets of B’ and B polyhedra.

Lower dimensional perovskites 
3D perovskites form when there is a smaller cation in the A site so BX6 octahedra can be corner shared. 2D perovskites form when the A-site cation is larger so octahedra sheets are formed. In 1D perovskites, a chain of octahedra is formed 

while in 0D perovskites, individual octahedra are separated from each other. Both 1D and 0D perovskites lead to quantum confinement  and are investigated for lead-free perovskite solar cell materials.

See also 

 Post-perovskite
 Silicate perovskite

References

External links 
 
 

Calcium minerals
Titanium minerals
Oxide minerals
Orthorhombic minerals
Minerals in space group 62
Perovskites